Comparative contextual analysis is a methodology for comparative research where contextual interrogation precedes any analysis of similarity and difference. It is a thematic process directed and designed to explore relationships of agency rather than institutional or structural frameworks. See structure and agency and theory of structuration.

References 
 Findlay, M. (1999) The Globalisation of Crime: Understanding Transitional Relationships in Context. Cambridge: Cambridge University Press.

External links 
 Cambridge University Press page
 Criminal Justice Modeling and the Comparative Contextual Analysis of Trial Process

Criminal justice
Comparisons